The Zushimiao Formation is located in Xichuan County, Henan province and contains carbonaceous and siliceous slate with interbeds of coal seams.

References 

Geologic formations of China
Cambrian System of Asia
Cambrian China
Coal formations
Slate formations
Geology of Henan